Public Bath No. 7 is a historic bathhouse located in Park Slope, Brooklyn, New York City. It was designed by Brooklyn architect Raymond F. Almirall. It was built between 1906 and 1910 and is constructed of white glazed brick and limestone colored terra cotta blocks.  The design is based on a Renaissance palazzo.  It measures three bays by five bays.  The bathhouse was converted to a gymnasium in 1937.

It was listed on the National Register of Historic Places in 1985.

In the 1990s it was converted to a private events space and renamed The Lyceum.

In 2014 the property was lost to foreclosure.

In 2017 the building finished restoration.

See also 
List of New York City Landmarks
National Register of Historic Places listings in Kings County, New York

References

Government buildings on the National Register of Historic Places in New York City
Buildings and structures in Brooklyn
New York City Designated Landmarks in Brooklyn
Romanesque Revival architecture in New York City
Government buildings completed in 1906
National Register of Historic Places in Brooklyn
1906 establishments in New York City
Park Slope